Mana Party ('Our Party') is a political party in Andhra Pradesh, India. It was founded in 2007 by 93 BC Castes' Aiykya Vedika. MLC Kasani Gnaneswer is the president of the party. The party seeks to represent backward caste interests.

References

Political parties in Andhra Pradesh
2007 establishments in Andhra Pradesh
Political parties established in 2007